This is a list of American television-related events in 1959.

Events

Television programs

Debuts

Ending this year

Made-for-TV movies and miniseries

Television stations

Station launches

Network affiliation changes

Station closures

Births

Deaths

See also 
1959 in television 
1959 in film 
1959 in the United States 
List of American films of 1959

References

External links
List of 1959 American television series at IMDb